Cynthia Jeanette Myers (September 12, 1950 – November 4, 2011) was an American model, actress, and Playboy magazine's Playmate of the Month for the December 1968 issue.

Career
Myers was the first Playboy Playmate born in the 1950s when she appeared in the magazine in December 1968. The pictures were shot in June 1968 when she was 17 years old, but it was Playboy's policy at that time to wait until a Playmate turned 18 before her pictures would be published.

Her pictorial was titled "Wholly Toledo!" because of Myers' hometown and large breasts. Her centerfold was photographed by Pompeo Posar, and quickly became a favorite of American troops in Vietnam. The centerfold appears in the 1987 film Hamburger Hill and in the 1989 film The Siege of Firebase Gloria. According to Myers, she was 13 when her breasts began to develop to the size 39 DD they were when she appeared in Playboy. After her magazine debut, Myers made frequent appearances on Hugh Hefner's Playboy After Dark TV series in 1969. She made an uncredited appearance in They Shoot Horses, Don't They? (1969) before taking the leading role of the sensitive bisexual rock and roll singer and bass player Casey Anderson in Russ Meyer's Beyond the Valley of the Dolls (1970). She followed this with a supporting role in the Western, Molly and Lawless John (1972).

In 1994, it became known that a nude photo of Myers (along with fellow playmates Angela Dorian, Reagan Wilson and Leslie Bianchini) was scanned and inserted into Apollo 12 extra-vehicular activity astronaut cuff checklists by the Apollo 12 backup crew (Dave Scott, Jim Irwin, Al Worden) at NASA.

In 2009, Myers became a spokeswoman for Schlitz beer.

Bill Cosby
Sometime after 1997, Myers provided interviews for the book Centerfolds, which was released in 2015. In these undated interviews, she claimed she personally witnessed Cosby "use drugs to have sex with women" at the Playboy Mansion, stating that his actions repulsed her so much she was unable to "shed a tear" when Cosby's son Ennis was murdered in 1997.

Death
Myers died of lung cancer at age 61 on November 4, 2011.

See also
 List of people in Playboy 1960–1969

References

External links

 
 

1950 births
2011 deaths
American film actresses
Actresses from Toledo, Ohio
1960s Playboy Playmates
Deaths from lung cancer in California
21st-century American women